Florian Weber (born 11 November 1977) is a German pianist and composer of modern jazz.

Early life and education
Weber was born on 11 November 1977 in Detmold. His family was musical: "his father was a music professor and his mother an opera singer. He began learning the piano at the age of four and had played in both classical and jazz ensembles by the time he left high school." In 1999, he received a scholarship to attend Berklee College of Music in Boston. Later, he studied with John Taylor in Cologne, Joanne Brackeen and Paul Bley in Boston, and Richie Beirach and Lee Konitz in New York.

Career
Together with bassist Jeff Denson and drummer Ziv Ravitz, Weber founded Minsarah (Hebrew for "prism") in 2002. Their 2006 eponymous album was awarded the German Record Critics' Prize.

The saxophonist Lee Konitz began working with the Trio Minsarah in 2006, and the group became a quartet. They began to tour, mainly in the United States. Their first CD, Deep Lee, was released by Enja Records around 2008. A concert was recorded and released as New Quartet Live at the Village Vanguard.

In 2011, Weber founded a group called Biosphere with Lionel Loueke (guitar), Thomas Morgan (bass) and Dan Weiss (drums). Their album Biosphere was released by Enja Records. The same label released Weber's trio album Criss Cross.

Weber recorded the duet album Alba with trumpeter Markus Stockhausen for ECM Records around 2016, and recorded the quartet Lucent Waters for the same label in 2017.

Awards and honors
In 2013, Weber received an Echo Music Prize for best instrumentalist of the year (piano/keyboard). In January 2014, he received the WDR Jazz Prize for jazz improvisation.

Discography

As leader/co-leader

Notes

References

1977 births
Living people
German jazz composers
Male jazz composers
German jazz pianists
German male pianists
21st-century pianists
21st-century German male musicians
ECM Records artists
Enja Records artists
Intakt Records artists